Windless Bight is the prominent bight indenting the south side of Ross Island eastward of Hut Point Peninsula. Named by the Winter Journey Party, led by Wilson, of the British Antarctic Expedition (1910–13), which encountered no wind in this area.

Bays of Ross Island
Bights (geography)